Polyvinyl chloride acetate (PVCA) is a thermoplastic copolymer of vinyl chloride and vinyl acetate.  It is used in the manufacture of electrical insulation, of protective coverings (including garments), and of credit cards and "vinyl" audio recordings.

References

Acetate esters
Copolymers
Organochlorides
Vinyl polymers